Turki bin Bandar Al Saud is a Saudi royal who has been the commander of Saudi Air Force since February 2018.

Early life and education
Prince Turki is a son of Bandar bin Abdulaziz Al Saud. One of his brothers is Prince Khalid.

Prince Turki received a bachelor's degree in aerial science.

Career
He held several position in Saudi Air Force, including operations center director, zone commander, flight officer and the commander of King Abdulaziz Air Base in Dhahran and in the Eastern Province. He was promoted to the rank of lieutenant general and named the commander of Saudi Air Force in February 2018.

Honours
Turki bin Bandar is the recipient of Kuwait Liberation Medal and the 30-Year Military Service Pendant.

References

External links

Lieutenant generals
Living people
Turki
Turki
Turki
Year of birth missing (living people)